Dongsha Airport  is located on Pratas Island (Tungsha/Dongsha) in Cijin District of Kaohsiung, Taiwan.   Uni Air offers flights from Kaohsiung once per week each Thursday, however the service is only available for Coast Guard Administration staff.

Since there are no refueling facilities within the airport, there is a limit of 56 passengers and 500 kilograms of cargo load per flight.

Airlines and destinations

See also 
Yongxing Island Airport (Woody Island in the Paracel Islands)
Taiping Island Airport
List of airports in the Spratly Islands

References

Airports in Kaohsiung
South China Sea